The Mount Myohyang (Hangul: 묘향산 - "Mysterious Fragrant Mountain") is a mountain in North Korea. It is named after the mystic shapes and fragrances found in the area. It is a sacred site as, according to legend, it was the home of King Tangun, forefather of the Korean people.

Tourism
Myohyang is a North Korean tourist attraction and visited by many national tourists. There are several hiking routes on the mountain. Apart from the view, tourists are attracted by the Pohyon temple, built in the 11th century, the Sangwon hermitage, the Kumgang hermitage, and the Habiro hermitage. The Ryongmun cavern is open to the public.

At Myohyang-san is the International Friendship Exhibition centre, dubbed the world's biggest treasure-house. On exhibit are presents received by North Korean leaders over the years. One building stores the presents given to Kim Il-sung, while a smaller one holds those given to his son Kim Jong-il.

The Hyangsan Hotel caters to luxury visitors, while the Chongchon Hotel is second-class.

Environment
Much of the mountain is covered by mixed broadleaf and coniferous forest and protected in a  national park. Some  has been identified by BirdLife International as an Important Bird Area (IBA).

World Biosphere Reserve
In 2009 UNESCO designated Mount Myohyang a world biosphere reserve, citing its cultural significance as well as the spectacular cliffs providing habitat for 30 endemic plant species, 16 plant species that are threatened globally and 12 endangered animal species.

References

External links
Ryongmun Cavern picture album at Naenara
Hyangsan Hotel picture album at Naenara
Another picture album at Naenara

Mountains of North Korea
Biosphere reserves of North Korea
Important Bird Areas of North Korea